The Netherlands remained neutral during World War I, a stance that arose partly from a strict policy of neutrality in international affairs that started in 1830, with the secession of Belgium from the Netherlands. Dutch neutrality was not guaranteed by the major powers in Europe and was not part of the Dutch constitution. The country's neutrality was based on the belief that its strategic position between the German Empire, German-occupied Belgium, and the British guaranteed its safety.

The Royal Netherlands Army was mobilized throughout the conflict, as belligerents regularly attempted to intimidate the Netherlands and to place demands on it. In addition to providing a credible deterrence, the army had to house refugees, guard internment camps for captured soldiers, and prevent smuggling.

The government also restricted the free movement of people, monitored spies, and took other wartime measures.

Background 
Before the First World War, the Netherlands hosted two major international peace conferences. The first, the First Hague Conference, was held in May 1899 on the initiative of Tsar Nicholas II of Russia. Representatives of 26 nations conferred on the limitation of certain types of weapons, including poison gas, hollow point bullets and aerial bombardment from hot air balloons. The conference was a surprising success, and agreements were reached on the laws of war and on war crimes.

Politics 
The Dutch monarch, Queen Wilhelmina, was known for her fierce patriotism and strong-willed nature. She leaned towards sympathy for France and Belgium but only in private and evinced a neutral stance in public. Her German husband, the prince-consort Duke Henry of Mecklenburg-Schwerin, was openly pro-German. His nephew, Frederick Francis IV, served in the German Army.

On 29 August 1913, a centrist liberal minority cabinet was appointed under the leadership of the independent liberal Prime Minister Pieter Cort van der Linden. His cabinet governed until 9 September 1918, an unusually-long period for a Dutch cabinet. During that period, the important post of Minister of Foreign Affairs was taken by John Loudon.

Although the government as a whole was strictly neutral, each member maintained individual preferences. Some ministers were in favour of France, and Prime Minister Cort van der Linden was privately seen as German-friendly and nicknamed "Kurt Unter der Linden," after Berlin's Unter den Linden boulevard.

During the war, the Dutch people were generally sympathetic towards the Allies. However, in Dutch Protestant or Neo-Calvinist circles, there was sympathy for the German cause, which was partly inspired by the memory of the Second Boer War (1899-1902), in South Africa.

Food shortages 
War conditions disrupted the Netherlands' food imports and caused shortages. From 3 July 1917, authorities in Amsterdam held back the potato supply until there was enough to feed the whole city. That led to a large riot and to the looting of stores and markets. Rioters broke into warehouses and took potatoes that were intended to be exported to England.

Two thousand soldiers were called in to break up the riot but were repelled by the rioters. Another clash took place in the city of Kattenberg in which three groups of workmen, one from the Stoomvaart Maatschappij Nederland, protested the lack of food for manual laborers. They also demanded to receive actual food, not promissory papers.

Neutrality 
In the aftermath of the assassination of Archduke Franz Ferdinand, Austria-Hungary declared war on the Kingdom of Serbia at 11 a.m. on 28 July 1914. The Dutch declared themselves neutral on 30 July. According to international law, neutrality had to be declared in each instance of a war declaration between two sovereign nations. During August, the Dutch declaration of neutrality had to be repeated regularly.

The declaration consisted of 18 articles. The most important article stated that hostilities were not allowed within the territory and the waters of the Dutch Empire; no nation was allowed to use the territory and the waters as a base for military operations; and that foreign soldiers who, for whatever reason, crossed into Dutch territory would be interned in prisoner-of-war camps for the duration of the war.

Violations 

At the beginning of the war, the German Army marched near the Dutch–Belgian border in the province of Limburg. Dutch border guards made clear which part of the road was Dutch territory, and as a consequence, the German Army avoided it on its westward march. However, the Dutch were falsely accused by Belgian and French newspapers at the time of supporting the German invasion of Belgium.

Dutch sailors suffered from war-related incidents and neutrality violations. Several ships were torpedoed by German U-boats or sunk by British sea mines. The fishing town of Scheveningen lost 300 fishermen. In total, 862 fishermen died and 175 fishing boats were sunk. Some sea mines washed ashore and killed civilians or military specialists tasked with disarming the sea mines. To protect merchant ships, the Netherlands negotiated a free channel from the coast via the Dogger Bank to the North Sea with Germany.

Both Allied and German military aircraft violated Dutch airspace. On several occasions, lost British and German pilots dropped bombs on Dutch towns. The worst incident occurred on 30 April 1917, when a lost British pilot of the Royal Naval Air Service mistakenly dropped eight bombs on the town of Zierikzee, damaged several houses and killed a family of three. After initially denying the incident, the British government apologized and agreed to compensate the Dutch for damage and loss of life. A total of 107 airplanes and 24 seaplanes landed in the Netherlands, and 220 crewmen were taken prisoner. Of the crashed planes, 67 were repaired and added to the army's air department.

German Zeppelins on bombing raids against England frequently violated Dutch airspace because of weather conditions such as wind or fog. It is unclear whether Dutch fire was responsible for the downing of the Zeppelin LZ 54, which came down in the sea and led to the King Stephen incident in which British sailors let the German crew drown.

Espionage 
Its geographical significance and its international connections made the Netherlands become a hotbed of espionage. The country's neutrality allowed citizens of belligerent countries to travel freely to or from the Netherlands. Most spy agencies had operatives in the country. MI6 had a station in Rotterdam under the command of Richard B. Tinsley, who handled several important spy networks in Belgium, such as La Dame Blanche. The networks provided the Allies with intelligence concerning German troops behind the Western Front.

The German secret services also used Rotterdam as a base for espionage in Britain. From Rotterdam, spies were sent by ferry to spy on the Royal Navy.

Dutch citizens were in demand as spies, as they could travel freely throughout Europe. Some of the spies were executed for espionage. Haicke Janssen and Willem Roos, two unemployed Dutch sailors, were executed in 1915. The exotic dancer and courtesan Mata Hari, convicted of spying for Germany in France, was executed in 1917. In total, seven Dutch citizens were executed by the British, French and Germans, and many more were imprisoned.

Armed forces 

On 31 July 1914, the Dutch government ordered the full mobilization of its conscript armed forces of 200,000 men, including reserves and regional militias. The chief of staff, Lieutenant-General Cornelis Snijders, was promoted to full general and commander-in-chief, a position that existed only in wartime. Snijders was the first non-aristocratic Dutch general to become commander-in-chief, which until then had been reserved for senior princes of the House of Orange.

The Dutch military strategy was purely defensive and rested on three pillars. First, there was the Dutch Water Line, a defensive ring of rivers and lowland surrounding the core Dutch region of Holland that could be inundated. An older version had existed since the 16th century. The second line of defence was formed by a circle of 19th-century fortresses and further inundations around the capital of Amsterdam. The third pillar was the Veldleger, or mobile field army, which would operate outside the Waterline in the rural eastern and southern provinces. In August 1914, the field army had an operational strength of 88,770 soldiers.

During the war, militarily sensitive border areas and places considered essential to national defense were declared to be in a state of siege, a status immediately below a state of war. There, military authorities ruled under martial law, and non-residents could travel there only with a special permit. The prohibited border areas were expanded during the war to fight espionage and to restrict the access of suspect individuals.

The main weapons used by the Dutch army were the Männlicher rifle and the Schwarzlose machine gun, both of which were manufactured in Austria. Artillery was German and French but mostly outdated. The fortifications were also outdated.

At the start of the war, there was no air force, only a small aviation department within the army. During the war, foreign planes that crashed in Dutch territory were repaired to serve in the aviation department.

Volunteers in foreign armies 
Some Dutchmen volunteered for service in the French, British, German or Austro-Hungarian Armies, but exact numbers are unknown. The German Army did not accept foreign volunteers unless they had German nationality, and they were often directed to the Austro-Hungarian, Bulgarian or Ottoman Armies. Some immigrants from the Netherlands to Canada and a few who lived in the United States served with various Canadian regiments of the British Expeditionary Force. About 80 of those who served have been identified through the personnel records of the First World War that are held at Library and Archives Canada.

Refugees 

After the German invasion of Belgium on 4 August 1914, one million Belgians out of a total population of six million fled their country to the Netherlands. The first wave consisted of Belgians of German descent, German-speaking East Europeans, and Jews, who fell victim to the Belgian public's outrage directly after the invasion. Many chose to leave because their businesses and homes were raided by angry mobs.

The second wave was caused by the German Army's invasion and war crimes against civilians. Most of these refugees returned when the focus of military action became concentrated on the Western Front, but others moved on to England or France. An estimated 100,000 Belgians stayed in refugee camps during the war, the largest of the camps being in Nunspeet.

As well as Belgian civilians, there were political refugees from Germany, such as the German-American socialist Carl Minster; Germans escaping conscription into the army; and prisoners-of-war who had escaped from German camps, mostly Russians, Ukrainians, and Poles.

Foreign soldiers

Prisoners-of-war 

According to international law, soldiers of the warring nations who entered a neutral country were to be interned for the duration of the war. Of the soldiers who entered the Netherlands on purpose or by mistake, 33,105 were Belgians, 1,751 British, 1,461 Germans, 8 French and 4 Americans. Among the prisoners were pilots who had flown into Dutch airspace and crashed.

Most Belgian and British internees had fled to the Netherlands after the fall of Antwerp in 1914. Belgian prisoners were held captive in a camp in Amersfoort. The camp initially had a very strict regime, but after a revolt that resulted in the death of seven Belgians, the rules softened. As the prisoners would not be released until the end of the war, their wives and children often sought accommodation in the vicinity.

Most British prisoners-of-war were members of the 1st Royal Naval Brigade. They were interned in Groningen, where they were held captive under a mild regime, which allowed for trips into the city. Some British soldiers formed a cabaret group, named the Timbertown Follies, which toured throughout the country. The proceeds were donated to charities.

Many German soldiers entered the Netherlands by mistake, which occurred most frequently at the beginning of the war, as the border between the Netherlands and Belgium was confusing. The German prisoner-of-war camp was at Bergen, in the province of North Holland.

Deserters were not considered foreign soldiers when they entered neutral territory if they were unarmed, removed badges from their uniforms, and proclaimed themselves deserters to the proper authorities. Numbers are unknown, but most deserters by far were German. As deserters had no right to free accommodation or food, some of them were voluntarily interned in prisoner-of-war camps.

Edith Cavell

The well-known British nurse Edith Cavell, who was based in German-occupied Belgium and was involved in systematically sheltering British soldiers and funnelling them from occupied Belgium to the neutral Netherlands. Wounded British and French soldiers as well as Belgian and French civilians of military age were hidden from the Germans and provided with false papers by Prince Réginald de Croÿ at his château of Bellignies, near Mons. From there, they were conducted by various guides to the houses of Cavell, Louis Séverin and others in Brussels, where their hosts would furnish them with money to reach the Dutch frontier and provide them with guides obtained through Philippe Baucq. With the false papers, escaped soldiers were able to evade the Dutch authorities and avoid being interned, and at least some returned to Britain and resumed their service in the war against Germany. That made Cavell liable to capital punishment under German military law, which was duly implemented by a German firing squad.

The Dutch government would have been justified in making a strong protest to the British for the soldiers' passage through Dutch territory and their avoiding the internment mandated, as by international law, but it preferred to keep a low profile on the issue.

See also
Netherlands in World War II

References

Citations

Works cited

 
 Linden, Henk van der. The Live Bait Squadron: three mass graves off the Dutch coast, 22 September 1914. Soesterberg: Aspekt, 2014.

 Tuyll van Serooskerken, Hubert P. van. The Netherlands and World War I. Espionage, Diplomacy and Survival. Leiden: Brill, 2001.

World War I
World War I by country